The Vim Comedy Company was a short-lived movie studio in Jacksonville, Florida and New York City. Vim bought out Siegmund Lubin's Lubin Manufacturing Company Jacksonville, Florida facilities at 750 Riverside Avenue in 1915 after that company went bankrupt. It was founded by Louis Burstein and Mark Dintenfass. Vim specialized in two-reel comedies, producing hundreds of them in the short time it existed. Notable Vim actors were Oliver Hardy, Ethel Marie Burton, Walter Stull, Billy Ruge, Rosemary Theby, Billy Bletcher and his wife Arline Roberts, and Kate Price. At its peak Vim had a workforce of nearly 50 people. The Vim Comedy Company went out of business in 1917 after Oliver Hardy discovered that both Burstein and Dintenfass were stealing from the payroll. Vim was bought out by the King-Bee Films studio started by Burstein.

Films
The following films were produced by the Vim Comedy Company:

See also
 History of Jacksonville, Florida#Motion picture industry

References

Laurel & Hardy: a bio-bibliography By Wes D. Gehring
flickr – Vim Comedy Company: Jacksonville, Florida

Bibliography

External links
Vim Comedy Film Company – filmography at IMDb

Mass media companies established in 1915
Mass media companies disestablished in 1917
Defunct American film studios
1915 establishments in Florida
1917 establishments in Florida